Kuntur Salla (Quechua kuntur condor, salla large cliff of gravel, "condor cliff", Hispanicized spelling Condorsalla) is a  mountain in the Andes of Peru. It is located in the Arequipa Region, Condesuyos Province, Cayarani District.

References 

Mountains of Peru
Mountains of Arequipa Region